David John Magley (born November 24, 1959) is a retired American basketball player and coach. He is currently the president of The Basketball League after serving as commissioner of the National Basketball League of Canada (NBLC). Prior to becoming an NBLC executive, Magley was head coach of Bradenton Christian School in Bradenton, Florida, for 11 years and then led the Brampton A's for two seasons. He played basketball at South Bend LaSalle High School. Following his senior year, Magley was named Indiana Mr. Basketball, beating Randy Wittman and Ted Kitchel for the award, and was selected to the Academic All-State and Parade All American teams.  Dave was drafted with the fifth pick in the second round of the 1982 NBA Draft by the Cleveland Cavaliers. In his one NBA season, Dave appeared in fourteen games, recording a total of twelve points and ten rebounds. Magley also spent several years in the Continental Basketball Association for the Wyoming Wildcatters, Albany Patroons and Tampa Bay Thrillers.

Commissioner of the NBL Canada
On May 28, 2015, Magley officially became the commissioner of the National Basketball League of Canada, succeeding Paul Riley.  Several months prior, the league's Board of Directors unanimously voted to end Riley's stint as commissioner. Magley's overseeing of the 2015 NBL Canada Finals brawl helped him get the job. After completing his two-year contract as commissioner, he left to become the president and chief operating officer of the upstart North American Premier Basketball League in 2017.

References

1959 births
Living people
Albany Patroons players
American expatriate basketball people in Canada
American men's basketball coaches
American men's basketball players
Basketball coaches from Indiana
Basketball players from South Bend, Indiana
Brampton A's coaches
Cleveland Cavaliers players
Cleveland Cavaliers draft picks
Forwards (basketball)
Kansas Jayhawks men's basketball players
National Basketball League of Canada commissioners
Parade High School All-Americans (boys' basketball)
Tampa Bay Thrillers players
Wyoming Wildcatters players